Danny Griffin may refer to:
 Danny Griffin (footballer) (born 1977), Northern Irish footballer
 Danny Griffin (soccer) (born 1998), American soccer player